Pyrausta pulchripictalis is a moth in the family Crambidae. It was described by George Hampson in 1895. It is found in Grenada.

References

Moths described in 1895
pulchripictalis
Moths of the Caribbean